Maxton is a placename and a surname. It may refer to:

Places:
Maxton, Roxburghshire, Scotland
Maxton, Kent, England
Maxton, North Carolina

People:
Annie Maxton, Scottish socialist and trade unionist 
James Maxton (1885-1946), Scottish socialist politician 
John Maxton, Baron Maxton (born 5 May 1936), Scottish politician
Julie Maxton, New Zealand lawyer and academic
Graeme Maxton, Scottish-born author and economist

Other:
Clan Maxton, a Scottish clan

See also
Laurinburg-Maxton Airport
Maxthon